Yard Peak is a  mountain summit located on the common border that Duchesne County shares with Summit County in the U.S. state of Utah.

Description
Yard Peak is set within the High Uintas Wilderness on land managed by Uinta-Wasatch-Cache National Forest. It is situated along the crest of the Uinta Mountains which are a subset of the Rocky Mountains, and it ranks as the 40th-highest summit in Utah. Neighbors include Ostler Peak three miles to the west, The Cathedral two miles to the north, and Dead Horse Peak is 1.5 mile southeast. Precipitation runoff from this mountain drains north to the East Fork Bear River and south into headwaters of Rock Creek which is a tributary of the Duchesne River. This mountain's toponym has been officially adopted by the United States Board on Geographic Names.

Climate
Based on the Köppen climate classification, Yard Peak is located in a subarctic climate zone with cold snowy winters and mild summers. Tundra climate characterizes the summit and highest slopes.

Gallery

See also
 Geology of the Uinta Mountains

References

External links
 Yard Peak: weather forecast
 Yard Peak: Flickr photo
 Yard Peak rock climbing: Mountainproject.com

Mountains of Utah
Features of the Uinta Mountains
Mountains of Duchesne County, Utah
Mountains of Summit County, Utah
North American 3000 m summits
Wasatch-Cache National Forest